Robert Keith Stegall (born November 1, 1955) is an American country music recording artist and record producer. Active since 1980, Stegall has recorded two major-label studio albums: 1985's Keith Stegall and 1996's Passages, although he is mainly known for his production work.

Musical career
Robert Keith Stegall was born in Wichita Falls, Texas, in 1955. He performed in local bands, spent a short time in northwestern Louisiana (in the mid-1970s) where he operated a small-time music recording business, then moved to Nashville, Tennessee, at the persuasion of Kris Kristofferson.

Stegall charted thirteen singles on the Billboard Hot Country Songs charts, with the highest-peaking being 1985's "Pretty Lady", a No. 10 hit. Starting in the late 1980s, Stegall has been active primarily as a record producer for several recording acts, most notably Alan Jackson, George Jones, Zac Brown Band, and Clay Walker. Stegall has also written several of Jackson's singles, as well as George Strait's Number one hit "I Hate Everything" and Dr. Hook's "Sexy Eyes".

In 2008, Stegall co-founded the label Bigger Picture Music Group. The label closed in 2014.

In 2016, Stegall launched a Nashville-based production, management, and publishing firm, Dreamlined Entertainment Group, with Scott Miller of Miller Investment Management.

In October 2017, Fangate Music, a label run by Australian country music promoter Rob Potts, in conjunction with Sony Music Australia, announced their partnership with Stegall's Dreamlined Entertainment Group.

Discography

Albums

Singles

AB-side to "1969."

Music videos

References

1955 births
American country singer-songwriters
American male singer-songwriters
American country record producers
Living people
People from Wichita Falls, Texas
Singer-songwriters from Texas
Mercury Records artists
Epic Records artists
Capitol Records artists
Country musicians from Texas
Record producers from Texas